A. K. Padmanabhan is an Indian Marxist politician and former Politburo member, Communist Party of India (Marxist).

Political career
Padmanabhan hails from Tamil Nadu. He became the Central Committee member of the party and in 20th party congress of CPI(M), held in Calicut in April 2012, he was first elected to the Politburo of the Communist Party of India (Marxist). In June 2013 he visited China as a delegate at the invitation of the Communist Party of China. In 2013, he became the president of the Centre of Indian Trade Unions (CITU). Padmanabhan was also re elected into the Politburo in 21st party congress held in Visakhapatnam in April 2015. In 22nd party congress, he was dropped, replaced by Tapan Kumar Sen and remains as a Central Committee member of the party. Presently Padmanabhan is the vice president of Centre of Indian Trade Unions.

References

Living people
Trade unionists from Tamil Nadu
Communist Party of India (Marxist) politicians from Tamil Nadu
Year of birth missing (living people)
Place of birth missing (living people)